Alan Sunderland (born 1 July 1953) is an English former footballer who played as a forward in the Football League for Wolverhampton Wanderers, Arsenal and Ipswich Town. He was also capped once for England.

Club career
Sunderland was born in Conisbrough, Yorkshire, and began his career at Wolverhampton Wanderers as an apprentice who played as a midfielder. With Wolves he won the 1974 League Cup in a 2–1 win over Manchester City in the final at Wembley. Sunderland also went on to win the Second Division title in 1977 with Wanderers. Altogether he made just under 200 appearances and scored 30 goals for the Midlands side.

In November 1977, he joined Arsenal for £220,000. Whilst at Highbury he switched from being within the role of a midfielder to that of a centre forward. Sunderland became a regular starter for the club, playing in the 1978 FA Cup Final, which Arsenal lost to Ipswich Town.

Sunderland's most famous moment came in the 1979 FA Cup Final. During the game Arsenal had gone 2–0 up against Manchester United, with goals from Brian Talbot and Frank Stapleton, and looked set for victory with only five minutes remaining. However, United scored twice in three minutes, with goals from Gordon McQueen and Sammy McIlroy, and extra time loomed. In the very last minute of the match, however, Arsenal pushed forward in a desperate counter-attack. Liam Brady fed Graham Rix on the left wing, and his cross was converted by Sunderland at the far post to make the score 3–2, and win Arsenal the cup.

Sunderland stayed at Arsenal for another five years, forming an impressive partnership with Frank Stapleton for two seasons. He was the club's top scorer in 1979–80 together with 1981–82, and featured in the Arsenal sides that lost the 1980 FA Cup and Cup Winners' Cup finals.

However, after a spate of injuries and the arrivals of Tony Woodcock and Charlie Nicholas, he thus found himself out of the first team. Sunderland eventually left Arsenal after netting 92 goals from 281 appearances for the Gunners. He went on then joining Ipswich Town on loan in February 1984. He helped them to avoid relegation from the First Division, and made the move permanent later in the summer. He played for Ipswich until 1986, then had a brief stint at Irish club Derry City, before retiring.

Personal life
Following retirement, he opened a pub in Ipswich. He eventually emigrated to Malta where he coached Birkirkara F.C. based within the town of Birkirkara.

International career
Sunderland  won a single England cap which came in a 2–1 friendly win over Australia in Sydney on 31 May 1980, and also represented his country at under-21 (as an over-age player), under-23 and 'B' team level.

Honours
Wolverhampton Wanderers
League Cup: 1974
Second Division: 1977

Arsenal
FA Cup: 1979

References

External links
 

1953 births
Living people
People from Conisbrough
Footballers from Doncaster
Association football forwards
Arsenal F.C. players
English footballers
England international footballers
England B international footballers
England under-21 international footballers
England under-23 international footballers
Derry City F.C. players
Ipswich Town F.C. players
League of Ireland players
English Football League players
Wolverhampton Wanderers F.C. players
FA Cup Final players